Alumni Memorial Field at Foster Stadium is a 10,000-seat multi-purpose stadium in Lexington, Virginia, United States. It opened in 1962.  It is home to the Virginia Military Institute Keydets football team.

History
Alumni Memorial Field was built and completed in 1962. The cost was approximately $250,000, funded by the General Assembly of Virginia and VMI Alumni Association. Fiberglass seating was installed in 1974.

In 2006, many improvements were made to the stadium. A new scoreboard with a jumbotron was added, along with new concourses, restrooms, and locker rooms. It totaled for a cost of $15 million.

Features
After renovation to the stadium in 2006, Alumni Memorial Stadium features permanent ticket booths, new concourses, restrooms, and locker rooms. The playing surface is Bermuda Grass.

Tradition
Before every VMI home game, the VMI Corps of Cadets marches from their barracks onto the field while the VMI Regimental Band plays "Shenandoah", along with a cannon called "Little John" firing at the start and end of the game and after every VMI score.

Record crowds

On September 15, 1973, VMI fell to Navy 37–8 in the largest crowd in Alumni Memorial Field history, with an attendance of 10,000. Just three years earlier on October 31, 1970, before 2,400 spectators, VMI fell heavily to Davidson 55–21 in the smallest crowd in Alumni Memorial Field history.

See also
 List of NCAA Division I FCS football stadiums

References

External links
VMI Keydets

Sports venues completed in 1962
College football venues
American football venues in Virginia
Buildings and structures in Lexington, Virginia
VMI Keydets football
Multi-purpose stadiums in the United States
1962 establishments in Virginia
College track and field venues in the United States
Athletics (track and field) venues in Virginia
VMI Keydets sports venues